The Vit also Vid is a river in central northern Bulgaria with a length of 188 km. It is a tributary of Danube. The source of the Vit is in Stara Planina, below Vezhen Peak at an altitude of 2,030 m, and it empties into the Danube close to Somovit. The river has a watershed area of 3,228 km2, its main tributaries being Kamenska reka, Kalnik and Tuchenitsa.

Towns on or close to the river include Teteven, Pleven, Dolni Dabnik, Dolna Mitropoliya and Gulyantsi. At Teteven, the river is formed by the confluence of Beli Vit and Cherni Vit.

The river's name comes from Thracian *ūt, a word for "water" (cf. Greek ὕδωρ, hudōr).

Vit Ice Piedmont in Antarctica is named after the river.

References

Rivers of Bulgaria
Landforms of Lovech Province
Landforms of Pleven Province